You're All Surrounded is a 2014 South Korean television series starring Lee Seung-gi, Cha Seung-won, Go Ara, Ahn Jae-hyun, Park Jung-min, Oh Yoon-ah, and Sung Ji-ru. It aired on SBS from May 7 to July 17, 2014, on Wednesdays and Thursdays at 21:55 (KST) for 20 episodes.

Synopsis
After witnessing his mother's murder at a young age, Kim Ji-yong (Lee Seung-gi) became a detective in order to investigate his mother's death. He later changed his name to Eun Dae-gu to be unnoticed by his mother's killer. On his way, he reunites with Eo Soo-sun (Go Ara), who attended the same middle school and they gradually develop a romantic relationship. At the same time, he spies on his team leader, Seo Pan-seok (Cha Seung-won), believing that he is related to the killer of his mother's case. As he unravels the truth behind the incident 11 years ago, he learns about his past, identity as well as making deep connections with people around him.

Cast

Main
Lee Seung-gi as Eun Dae-gu / Kim Ji-yong 
Ahn Do-gyu as young Ji-yong
He is brusque, intelligent (with an IQ of 150), and has a photographic memory. His problem with authority stems from his painful past; as a young boy named Kim Ji-yong living in Masan, his mother was murdered in front of his eyes when she attempted to testify as a witness to a crime. To avoid getting killed himself, he changed his name to Eun Dae-gu and grew up in an orphanage. He eventually becomes a detective to bring his mother's killer to justice, while spying on his boss Seo Pan-seok, whom he believes conspired with his mother's killer.

Cha Seung-won as Seo Pan-seok 
The short-tempered captain of the Violent Crimes Unit. A legend at the precinct, Pan-seok is known for his tireless commitment to hunting down the most notorious criminals and his success rate in closing difficult cases, as well as his vocal disdain for higher-ups who abuse their authority. He initially despises being assigned rookies to mentor but, after a rough start, becomes fond of them as they prove themselves. But he has never forgotten a long-ago unsolved case involving the murder of a witness and the subsequent disappearance of her son, Kim Ji-yong, a case which is inextricably linked to his own family tragedy: the accidental death of his young son.

Go Ara as Eo Soo-sun
Ji Woo as young Soo-sun
Bold and persistent, Soo-sun applied seven times before being accepted into the police academy. She is the only female in the new class of officers. Soo-sun and Ji-yong went to the same middle school in Masan, but she initially doesn't recognize him in his present incarnation as Dae-gu.

Ahn Jae-hyun as Park Tae-il
Tae-il is secretive and laidback, but has a way with the ladies. He was in his first year of residency before deciding to leave medicine and become a detective, a decision his family disapproves of which led to his estrangement from them. He is sometimes mocked for being a stereotypical "rich kid" from Gangnam but proves himself with his dedication.

Park Jung-min as Ji Gook
A geeky and talkative guy whose sole reason for applying to the force was because he wanted to live in Gangnam. He unexpectedly becomes best friends with Tae-il, and develops a crush on Soo-sun.

Oh Yoon-ah as Kim Sa-kyung
Sa-kyung is a tenacious detective with strong convictions, whose personal goal is to pave the way for female cops to work in her precinct without being discriminated against. She is also Pan-seok's ex-wife, and the divorced couple are forced to work together when she is transferred to his police station as the new head detective of the Missing Persons Unit. She divorced him due to the grief and anger she felt over their son's death, but upon meeting again at the precinct, Sa-kyung and Pan-seok's love for each other resurfaces and they begin dating again.

Sung Ji-ru as Lee Eung-do
Pan-seok's older colleague who looks upon the new recruits affectionately.

Seo Yi-sook as Kang Seok-soon
The chief of police. She secretly sponsored and encouraged Dae-gu for eleven years up until police academy, but may have suspicious ties to Assemblyman Yoo, a crooked politician.

Supporting

Im Won-hee as Cha Tae-ho
Choi Hyo-eun as Park Soo-bin 
Jung Dong-hwan as Yoo Moon-bae
Moon Hee-kyung as Yoo Ae-yeon
Lee Ki-young as Shin Ji-il
 as Jang Hyang-sook
 as Jo Hyung-chul
Lee Yi-kyung as Shin Ki-jae

Special appearances

Kim Hee-jung as Kim Hwa-young, Ji-yong's mother (Ep. 1, 4, 17)
Lee Yang-hee as Pan-seok's partner (Ep. 1, 10)
Choi Jin-ho as Park Seung-ho (Ep. 1)
Lee Han-na as Shim Hye-ji (Ep. 1)
Yang Han-yeol as Park Min-soo (Ep. 1)
Maeng Bong-hak as Teacher (Ep. 1)
Seo Yoo-ri as Night club girl (Ep. 2)
Park Hwi-soon as Man on blind date (Ep. 3)
Kim Kang-hyun as Dokgo Soo, the stalker (Ep. 3–4)
Choi Young-shin as Yoon-jung (Ep. 3–5)
Lee Han-wi as Plastic surgery director Byung (Ep. 3)
Jung Se-hyung as Kim Jae-min
Choi Woo-shik as a perpetrator named Choi Woo-shik (Ep. 4)
Kim Min-ha as Ji-hee, the student/hostage (Ep. 4) 
Jo Hwi-joon as Seo Joon-woo, Pan-seok's son (Ep. 5)
Im Seung-dae as Prosecutor Han Myung-soo (Ep. 5–6, 19–20)
Choi Woong as Kim Shin-myung, hit and run suspect (Ep. 5–6)
Ahn Se-ha as Lee Young-gu, Shin-myung's chauffeur (Ep. 5–6)
Kim Ji-young as Lee Hyun-mi (Ep. 6)
Lee Geum-joo as Orphanage director (Ep. 6, 8)
Baek Seung-hyeon as Song Seok-won (Ep. 8–9)
Joo-ho as Song Seok-gu (Ep. 8–9)
--- as the missing car mechanic (Ep. 10–11)
Moon Ji-in as the mechanic's fiancée (Ep. 10)
Han Yoo-yi as young Kang Seok-soon (Ep. 16)
Seo Yoon-ah as Seo Kyung-eun (Ep. 16)
Jung Dong-gyu as Kwon Hyuk-joo

Production
While filming an action scene on June 9, 2014, Lee Seung-gi was poked in his left eye by a prop knife, causing corneal damage and an intraocular hemorrhage. His injury required Lee to rest for a few days, which resulted in the preemption of the 10th episode; a special aired instead on June 11, 2014.

Original soundtrack

Part 1

Part 2

Part 3

Part 4

OST Special

Viewership

Awards and nominations

References

External links
 

2014 South Korean television series debuts
2014 South Korean television series endings
Seoul Broadcasting System television dramas
Korean-language television shows
South Korean action television series
South Korean comedy television series
Television series by HB Entertainment